KPLT may refer to:

 KPLT (AM), a radio station (1490 AM) licensed to Paris, Texas, United States
 KPLT-FM, a  radio station (107.7 FM) licensed to Paris, Texas, United States